Arsaces I (from ; in  Aršak) was the first king of Parthia, ruling from 247 BC to 217 BC, as well as the founder and eponym of the Arsacid dynasty of Parthia. The leader of the Parni, one of the three tribes of the Dahae confederacy, Arsaces founded his dynasty in the mid-3rd century BC when he conquered the satrapy of Parthia (now shared between Turkmenistan and Iran) from Andragoras, who had rebelled against the Seleucid Empire. He spent the rest of his reign consolidating his rule in the region, and successfully stopped the Seleucid efforts to reconquer Parthia. Due to Arsaces' achievements, he became a popular figure amongst the Arsacid monarchs, who used his name as a royal honorific. By the time of his death, Arsaces had laid the foundations of a strong state, which would eventually transform into an empire under his great-grandnephew, Mithridates I, who assumed the ancient Near Eastern royal title of King of Kings. Arsaces was succeeded by his son Arsaces II.

Literary sources are very scarce on Arsaces, and exclusively come from contradictory Greek and Roman accounts written centuries after his death. As a result, his reign is sparsely known. His existence was even questioned by modern scholars, until new studies and archaeological findings confirmed his identity in the 1960s.

Name
 is the Latin form of the Greek Arsákēs, itself from Parthian Aršak. The name is diminutive of Old Iranian Aršan, meaning "hero". The name was also used by some of the rulers of the Persian Achaemenid Empire, including Artaxerxes II, whom the Arsacids considered their progenitor.

Background

The sources regarding Arsaces' differ greatly. He is mostly known from Greek and Roman sources, who were hostile to him and his dynasty due to the later Roman–Parthian Wars. In Iranian national history his descent is traced back to several mythical figures, such as being a descendant of either Kay Kawad, Kay Arash, Dara the son of Homay, or Arash, the heroic archer-figure. The affiliation of Arsaces with Arash is due to the resemblance in their names and Arsaces' coins imitating him as a bowman. According to Roman historian Ammianus Marcellinus, Arsaces was a bandit of low birth, who invaded and conquered Parthia, killing its satrap Andragoras, who had recently declared independence from the Hellenistic Seleucid Empire.

The most accepted theory is the one by the Greek geographer Strabo: according to him, Arsaces was a Scythian or a Bactrian chieftain, who became the leader of the Parni, one of the three tribes of the Dahae confederacy of Central Asia. The Dahae relied their strength completely on horseback, and thus possessed an extremely mobile force, which was able to retreat to the south of the Aral Sea when endangered. Because of this, other empires met complications in their efforts trying to control them.

The Dahae had originally lived between the Jaxartes in the 4th-century BC, but gradually moved southward, possibly in the early 3rd-century BC. They first migrated southeast to Bactria, but were driven away, and as a result changed their course to the west. They gradually started settling in Parthia, a region in the south-eastern part of the Caspian Sea, that almost corresponded to present-day Khorasan Province of Iran and southern Turkmenistan. The region was then under the rule of the Seleucids. By 282/1 BC, Parthia was under considerable Parni influence. The Parni were not the only to migrate to Parthia, as the region was constantly receiving new waves of Iranian migrants from the north.

The Parni were an eastern Iranian tribe, who practised Iranian polytheism. By the middle of the 3rd-century BC, however, they had been assimilated into the local Parthian culture; they adopted Parthian, a north-western Iranian language, and became adherents of the Zoroastrianism religion, even giving themselves Zoroastrian names, such as Arsaces' father, Phriapites, whose name was derived from Avestan *Friya pitā ("father-lover"). Arsaces himself was probably born and raised in Parthia, speaking the Parthian language. According to the French historian Jérôme Gaslain, Arsaces could have arguably spent much of his life in the Seleucid lands, and may even have belonged to the local elite of Parthia.

The Dahae frequently served as horse archers in the armies of Greek rulers, from the Macedonian Alexander the Great to the Seleucid Antiochus III the Great. This implies that Arsaces, who is described as an "experienced soldier" in classical records, may have served as a mercenary under the Seleucid rulers or their governors.

Reign

Accession and wars 
In c. 250 BC, Arsaces and his Parni followers seized Astauene, which lay near the Atrek valley. A few years later, probably in c. 247 BC, Arsaces was crowned king in Asaak, a city which he had founded, and which served as the Arsacid royal necropolis. His coronation at Asaak is generally presumed to mark the start of the Arsacid dynasty. Around 245 BC, Andragoras, the governor of the Seleucid province of Parthia, proclaimed his independence from the Seleucid monarch Seleucus II Callinicus, and made his governorate an independent kingdom. Following the secession of Parthia from the Seleucid Empire and the resultant loss of Seleucid military support, Andragoras had difficulty in maintaining his borders, and about 238 BC—under the command of Arsaces and his brother Tiridates I the Parni invaded Parthia and seized control of Astabene (Astawa) from Andragoras, the northern region of that territory, the administrative capital of which was Kuchan. 
 
A short while later, the Parni seized the rest of Parthia from Andragoras, killing him in the process. With the conquest of the province, the Arsacids became known as Parthians in Greek and Roman sources. This term has likewise been in regular use by modern western authors as well, however, according to the modern historian Stefan R. Hauser, it "should be abandoned as it conveys an incorrect idea of an ethnic ruling class within the multiethnic, multilingual population". The neighbouring province of Hyrcania was shortly conquered by the Parni as well. A recovery expedition by the Seleucids under Seleucus II was made in 228 BC, which proved problematic for Arsaces, who was at the same time at war with the Greco-Bactrian ruler Diodotus II. In order to avoid fighting on two fronts, Arsaces quickly concluded a peace treaty with Diodotus II.

Nevertheless, he was unable to stop the Seleucid expedition and was forced to leave Parthia for Central Asia, where he took refuge with the Apasiacae. The Seleucid conquest proved to be short-lived; due to issues in the western portions of the Seleucid Empire, Seleucus II was forced to leave Parthia, which gave Arsaces the opportunity to regain his lost territories, and most likely also expand his dominion further south. Indeed, Arsaces' withdrawal to the Apasiacae was perhaps a strategic move, since Seleucus II neither possessed the resources to chase him nor the time to conclude a peace treaty. Arsaces also made an alliance with the Greco-Bactrians, which confirms that contact between the two powers had most likely been established long ago. According to the Roman historian Justin, Arsaces "settled the Parthian government, levied soldiers, built fortresses, and strengthened his towns." Apart from Asaak, he also founded the city of Dara in Mount Zapaortenon, a place in Parthia. Nisa, likewise founded by Arsaces, would be then used as the royal residence of the Arsacids till the 1st-century BC.

Succession 

For a long time, the line of succession of Arsaces, and to some extent his historicity, had been unclear. The now-deprecated narrative of the foundation of the Arsacid dynasty by Arsaces and his brother Tiridates, who led the Parni in revolt together, was established by Jean Foy-Vaillant in 1725. He and generations of scholars thought that after Arsaces' death, Tiridates succeeded him as king of the Arsacid dynasty. This led to some different theories, including one that considered Arsaces a legendary figure, whilst attributing the foundation of the Arsacids to Tiridates.

Between 1957 and 1962 Józef Wolski published a series of articles with the opposite view: he regarded Arsaces as the founder of the Arsacids, and Tiridates as legendary. This theory has since been supported—with minor divergences—by most scholars, until its confirmation by the discovery in Nisa of an ostracon bearing the name of Arsaces. Moreover, numismatic data and recent analysis of the sources have led to the conclusion that the character of Tiridates is indeed fictional, and that Arsaces continued to rule until his death in 217 BC, where he was succeeded by his son, Arsaces II.

Coinage 

In essence, Arsaces' coins "provided the prototype for all subsequent Arsacid coinage, although itself undergoing a few changes". Khodadad Rezakhani adds that his coins took many stylistic elements from Seleucids and earlier Achaemenid satrapal issues, but he nonetheless made several innovations that differentiated them from those of his predecessors. According to Alireza Shapour Shahbazi, on his coins, Arsaces "deliberately diverges from Seleucid coins to emphasize his nationalistic and royal aspirations"; the typical Seleucid figure of Apollo seated on the omphalos and holding a bow is replaced by an archer imitating Arsaces, who is seated on a stool (done in the same fashion as some Achaemenid satraps, such as Datames) whilst wearing Sakaian clothing and a soft cap, known as the bashlyk. 

Some of the inscriptions on Arsaces' coins calls him kārny (the Greek equivalent being autokrator), which was a title carried by prominent Achaemenid military leaders, such as Cyrus the Younger. Through the use of this title, Arsaces was deliberately putting himself above that of a satrap, but simultaneously avoided using the royal title of basileus (king), which would imply that he followed the Seleucid regal tradition, which he dismissed. From an Iranian point of view, the title of basileus was of minor importance. 

Arsaces seemingly used the city he had founded – Nisa, as a site for his coin mints. The coins of Arsaces were minted in both silver and bronze. Arsaces' silver drachms (which would become the main denomination of the Arsacids) depict his unbearded profile on the obverse, looking to the right, similar to depictions of Seleucid royals on coins. According to Fabrizio Sinisi, similarly, the seated archer on the reverse is turned to the left. The Greek legend ΑΡΣΑΚΟΥ ΑΥΤΟΚΡΑΤΟΡΟΣ is inscribed in two vertical lines on the sides of the drachms, in similar fashion to Seleucid coins. Regardless of these features, Sinisi notes that Arsaces' coins are "immediately recognizable as issued by a non-Greek ruler". For instance, Arsaces wears the pointed soft cap on the obverse, similar to coins of the Achaemenid era, as does the archer on the reverse who is dressed in an Iranian riding costume.

Legacy 
Arsaces' prestige endured long after his death. An everlasting fire in his honour was still guarded in the city of Asaak more than two centuries after his death, as reported by Isidore of Charax. This indicates that the act of declaring a king had a religious importance. It most likely served as the dynastic fire of the Arsacids, possibly created in order to highlight that they were heirs to the Achaemenid Empire. Due to his achievements, he became known as the "father of the nation", and his name became a royal honorific that was used by all the Arsacid monarchs out of admiration for his achievements. The name also connected the Arsacids with the legendary Kayanian ruler Kavi Arshan, whose dynasty must still have been remembered by the inhabitants of eastern Iran, such as the Parthians and the Dahae. A fictitious claim was later made from the 2nd-century BC onwards by the Arsacids, which represented Arsaces as a descendant of the Achaemenid King of Kings, Artaxerxes II.

The family of Arsaces would rule for four and a half centuries, till it was toppled by the Sasanian Empire in 224 AD. Even then, however, the descendants of Arsaces continued to wield considerable influence and authority; one of the Seven Great Houses of Iran, the House of Karen, produced several major figures in Iranian history, such as the 6th-century vizier Bozorgmehr, and the 9th-century prince and rebel Mazyar. The Arsacids also played an important role in the history of the Caucasus; the principalities of Armenia, Caucasian Albania and Iberia were ruled by branches of the Arsacid dynasty. According to Procopius, even as late as the 6th-century, the Armenian nobility still remembered their Arsacid heritage and the character of Arsaces.

Family tree

Notes

References

Bibliography

Ancient works 
Isidore of Charax, Parthian Stations.
Justin, Epitome of the Philippic History of Pompeius Trogus.
Ammianus Marcellinus, Res Gestae.
Strabo, Geographica.

Modern works 
 
 
 
 
 
 
 
 
 
 
 
 
 
 
 
 
 
 
 
 
 
 
 
 
Jean Foy-Vaillant, Arsacidarum imperium, sive, Regum Parthorum historia : ad fidem numismatum accommodata, Paris, 1725.
 
Józef Wolski, "L'Historicité d'Arsace Ier", in Historia: Zeitschrift für Alte Geschichte, Bd. 8, H. 2 (Apr., 1959), pp. 222–238.
——, "Arsace II et la Généalogie des Premiers Arsacides", in Historia: Zeitschrift für Alte Geschichte, Bd. 11, H. 2 (Apr., 1962), pp. 138–145.

217 BC deaths
3rd-century BC Parthian monarchs
3rd-century BC births
3rd-century BC Iranian people